Clyde Getty (born 22 September 1961) is an Argentine freestyle skier. Getty was born in the United States to Argentinian parents.

Career
Although Clyde Getty qualified for the US team, he opted to join the Argentinian Olympic Ski Team instead, because of his lineage. Getty competed in the Torino Olympics Men's freestyle skiing and was the oldest competitor at the event.

In 1989 Getty became a member of the US Freestyle Skiing Team. After finishing, Getty continued to manage his computer systems consulting business, GettySystems.

References

External links
 Sports Reference Profile
 Skiing profile

Citizens of Argentina through descent
Olympic freestyle skiers of Argentina
Argentine male freestyle skiers
Freestyle skiers at the 2002 Winter Olympics
Freestyle skiers at the 2006 Winter Olympics
American male freestyle skiers
1961 births
Living people